Buttercup is a Philippine television series on ABS-CBN. Starring Claudine Barretto, Assunta de Rossi, Piolo Pascual, Diether Ocampo and Angelu de Leon. It aired from May 31, 2003 to May 8, 2004.

Cast

Main cast
 Claudine Barretto as Meg
 Angelu de Leon as Cloe
 Assunta de Rossi as Sharon
 Piolo Pascual as Lance
 Diether Ocampo as Winston
 Onemig Bondoc as Wilson
 Bobby Andrews as Ted
 Carlos Agassi as Pippo
 Ciara Sotto as Sheryl
 Mico Palanca as Chris

Supporting Cast
 Rio Locsin as Elsa
 John Arcilla as Orly
 Tin Arnaldo as Caroline Uy
 Ricardo Cepeda as Christopher 
 Carmi Martin as Angela 
 Jenny Miller as Rochelle
 Tessie Tomas as Erlinda
 Mat Ranillo III as Eduardo
 Buboy Garovillo as Miguel
 Carla Martinez as Carmelita
 Ricky Davao
 Tetchie Agbayani
 Pinky Amador
 Miguel Vera as Rolie
 Frances Ignacio as Lily
 Marjorie Barretto
 Eugene Domingo as Susan
 Angel Jacob as Monica

ABS-CBN original programming
Philippine teen drama television series
2003 Philippine television series debuts
2004 Philippine television series endings
Filipino-language television shows